The Suffolk Institute of Archaeology and History is the county archaeological society for the county of Suffolk, England. In 1848 the Bury and West Suffolk Archaeological Institute was established at Bury St Edmunds in the former county of West Suffolk. In 1853 acquired a function for the two counties of West and East Suffolk (united since 1974).

It has no permanent premises, but is administered by officers and an elected council, under the patronage of a president. It holds excursions and meetings for lectures, has a field group, and publishes a twice-annual newsletter and an annual volume of proceedings. The latter usually contains four leading articles, shorter contributions, and a section describing the archaeological discoveries and excavations of the preceding year.

The institute is open to public membership by payment of a subscription fee. It can sponsor archaeological or historical research through moderate grants, and has a role of advocacy within the county. It has a membership of approximately 1,000, including corporate memberships.

Sources

External links

Archaeological organizations
Archaeology of England
Organisations based in Suffolk
Historical societies of the United Kingdom
1853 establishments in England
Organizations established in 1853